The Journal of Health Care for the Poor and Underserved is an academic journal founded in 1990 by David Satcher, then President of Meharry Medical College who later became the 16th Surgeon General of the United States. JHCPU is published by the Johns Hopkins University Press for Meharry and is affiliated with the Association of Clinicians for the Underserved.

The journal covers the health and health care of medically underserved populations in North and Central America, the Caribbean, and sub-Saharan Africa, as well as internally dispossessed Indigenous populations worldwide. The topical scope is broad covering such areas as the epidemiology of inequities, structural racism, social determinants of health, quality, costs, regulation, legislation, and disease prevention. Articles primarily take the form of scholarly research, as well as policy analyses and book reviews. 

The current editor is Virginia Brennan of Meharry Medical College. The journal is published quarterly in February, May, August, and November, with occasional supplemental issues. It is listed as one of the nation's leading Health Policy journals by the Kaiser Family Foundation and as an essential core journal in Public Health Practice by the Medical Library Association's Core Public Health Journals Project.

See also
Health equity
Health inequities
Health disparities
Health care delivery
Health care system
Meharry Medical College
Historically Black Colleges and Universities

External links 
JHCPU on the JHU Press website
JHCPU  at Project MUSE
Medical Library Assn. Core Public Health Journal Project

Public health journals
Research on poverty
Quarterly journals
Johns Hopkins University Press academic journals
English-language journals
Publications established in 1990